Paul Varul (born 10 December 1952 in Valga) is an Estonian lawyer and politician. He was the Minister of Justice of Estonia 1995–1999. He was involved in drafting all the major legal acts of private law in Estonia (examples include: Law of Property Act, General Part of the Civil Code Act, Family Law Act, Law of Succession Act, Commercial Code, Law of Obligations Act, Bankruptcy Act, Reorganisation Act, Electronic Communications Act etc.). He has also been an expert contributor to the drafting of the National Central Bank Act (Eesti Pank Act) and the legislation regulating the pursuit of business of a credit institution (including the Credit Institutions Act).

Currently Varul is a senior partner of the law firm TGS Baltic. He is one of the Founding Members of the European Law Institute, a non-profit organisation that conducts research, makes recommendations and provides practical guidance in the field of European legal development with a goal of enhancing the European legal integration.

External links
TGS Baltic
European Law Institute

1952 births
Living people
20th-century Estonian lawyers
21st-century Estonian lawyers
Justice ministers of Estonia
People from Valga, Estonia
University of Tartu alumni
Recipients of the Order of the White Star, 4th Class
20th-century Estonian politicians